is a Japanese horror/dark fantasy film.  It is a spin-off of the Teito Monogatari franchise.  It is not based on the original novel, but rather adapted from a side story novel, Karakuri Doshi (which occurs in contemporary times).  Like the animated adaptation which preceded it, the film is much darker, more violent and sexualized than its predecessors, and deviates greatly from its source material.  It was released through V-Cinema in 1995.

The film was advertised as being a direct sequel to Tokyo: The Last War going so far as to include a silhouette of actor Kyusaku Shimada in many of the promotional materials.  However the movie was produced by a completely different studio and worked on by a different creative staff from the Toho distributed adaptations.

Synopsis
In 1995, a mental hospital is erected near the Japanese Ministry of Finance, located adjacent to the grave of Taira no Masakado.  A young male nurse by the name of Jin’ya Yanase is obsessed with the legend of Taira no Masakado and more importantly, the spirit of his evil subordinate Yasunori Kato.  Slowly, he becomes possessed by Kato's spirit, who wants to use him as a new host to revive in the modern world.  Keiko Tatsumiya (the heroine of the original story), is an old woman living homeless on the streets of Tokyo.  When she senses the presence of Yasunori Kato, she must regain her resolve to face the demon-god and vanquish his spirit once and for all.

References
Notes

Bibliography

External links

Teito Monogatari Gaiden at Japanese Horror Movie Database

1995 films
Japanese dark fantasy films
Japanese epic films
Films based on Japanese novels
Japanese fantasy adventure films
1990s Japanese-language films
Japanese science fiction horror films
Jidaigeki films
Tokusatsu films
1990s Japanese films